Gnadendorf is a town in the district of Mistelbach in the Austrian state of Lower Austria.

Geography
Gnadendorf is located in the valley of the Zaya River.

Subdivisions are:
Eichenbrunn
Gnadendorf
Oedenkirchenwald
Pyhra
Röhrabrunn
Wenzersdorf
Zwentendorf

Population

References

Cities and towns in Mistelbach District